Lutts is an unincorporated community in Wayne County, Tennessee, United States. It is also known as "Pinhook."

Lutts is served by the Lutts Volunteer Fire Department and Lutts Community Center. The Pinhook School formerly operated in Lutts.

Economy
The economy of Lutts is mainly agricultural.  However, there is a growing insurance industry that has been established in the area.

History
Little is known about origins except for the community of Pinhook which used to be the entire eastern section of the town.

Tornado

On the evening of December 23, 2015, an EF-3 tornado destroyed over 20 buildings in the Lutts community, including Lutts United Methodist Church and the United States Post Office. Postal operations are temporarily relocated to the office in nearby Collinwood, Tennessee.  The Methodist Church will be temporarily relocated to the fire hall.

Highways
 Tennessee State Route 203

Churches in or near Lutts
Bevis Church of Christ
Johnson's Chapel Freewill Baptist Church
Lutts Baptist Church
Lutts United Methodist Church
Martin's Mills Church of Christ
Mt. Hope Church of Christ
Second Creek Church of Christ
Schlomo Beth Israel Synagogue
State Line Church of Christ
Wayland Springs United Methodist Church

Nearby cities and communities
Collinwood (city)
Waynesboro (city)
Savannah (city)
Cypress Inn (unincorporated community)
Houston (unincorporated community)
Cromwell Crossroads (unincorporated community)
Martin's Mills (unincorporated community)

References

External links
 Pinhook School Class Picnic 1951

Unincorporated communities in Tennessee
Unincorporated communities in Wayne County, Tennessee